Brachyopa exigua is an Asian species of hoverfly.

Distribution
Myanmar.

References

Diptera of Asia
Eristalinae
Insects described in 2015